Anthony Salis (born 13 October 1988) is a French professional footballer who plays as a midfielder for National 3 club FC Balagne.

He played on the professional level in Ligue 2 for AC Ajaccio and SC Bastia. Salis led Vendée Poiré-sur-Vie Football to the 1/16-final of the 2014–15 Coupe de France, a match he missed through suspension as AJ Auxerre won on penalties.

Career
After two years with AS Furiani-Agliani, he signed a one-year contract with SC Bastia in 2018.

References

External links
 

1988 births
Living people
Association football midfielders
French footballers
Ligue 2 players
Championnat National players
Championnat National 2 players
Championnat National 3 players
AC Ajaccio players
UA Cognac players
Gazélec Ajaccio players
CA Bastia players
Vendée Poiré-sur-Vie Football players
SC Bastia players
Footballers from Corsica